"Te Dejo Madrid" (English: "I Leave You Madrid") is a song recorded by Colombian singer-songwriter Shakira for her fifth studio album, Laundry Service (2001). It was written by the singer about the city of Madrid, the capital of Spain. The music video for it featured the singer as a bullfighter. Although it was released as the second single from the album in several European countries in 2002, it was not released in the United States. "Te Dejo Madrid" was a commercial success in Spain, peaking at number seven, but did not repeat the success of Shakira's previous singles in Latin America, peaking at number 45 on Billboard's Hot Latin Songs.

Music video
In the music video, Shakira is seen lying on a bed and in front of a mirror in a bullfighting costume. The television shows scenes from a bullfighting performance. It shows Shakira then running to the stadium, where these performances are recorded, with a pair of large scissors. When she arrives, there is a man, who is the bullfighter, inside the ring, who is pictured throughout the video as maybe her lover, who is looking in the mirror at himself. Shakira flips the mirror around so she is facing the bullfighter. Shakira is shown with a bull mask on and she is portrayed as the bull. They come face to face and she touches his lips, but turns away and plays the harmonica solo. The video ends with Shakira cutting off her long hair in the mirror.

Spanish bullfighter Julián López Escobar, better known by his stage name El Juli, filed a lawsuit against Shakira for using scenes of one of his performances in the music video for "Te Dejo Madrid" without his permission. She was sued for five million dollars for "plagiarism of image in use and exercise of his profession".

Live performances
In 2002 and 2003, Shakira performed the song live on her Tour of the Mongoose. However, the song was performed only on the Spanish-speaking countries which were visited for the tour. In 2006 and 2007, Shakira performed the song on every concert of her Oral Fixation Tour. In 2010 and 2011, Shakira performed the song on every concert of her The Sun Comes Out World Tour.

Charts

Certifications

Release history

References

Songs about Spain
Songs about cities
Songs about parting
2002 singles
Shakira songs
Spanish-language songs
Songs written by Shakira
2001 songs
Songs written by George Noriega
Epic Records singles